Niels Alexander Torre (born 3 September 1999) is an Italian world champion rower. He won the 2022 world championship title in the Italian men's lightweight quad scull.

Previously he had won a gold medal at the 2022 European Rowing Championships. and a silver medal at the 2020 European Rowing Championships.

References

External links

1999 births
Living people
Italian male rowers
World Rowing Championships medalists for Italy
21st-century Italian people
20th-century Italian people